T'iyuyuq (Quechua t'iyu sand, -yuq a suffix, "the one with sand", also spelled Thiuyoj) is a  mountain in Bolivia. It is located in the Potosí Department, Sud Lípez Province, San Pablo de Lípez Municipality. It lies southeast of Lípez and east of Suni K'ira.

References 

Mountains of Potosí Department